Urvillea ulmacea is a plant species in the genus Urvillea found in French Guiana and in the Caatinga region of Brazil.

References

External links

Sapindaceae
Flora of Brazil
Flora of French Guiana
Plants described in 1821